The Northern Territory Football League (NTFL) is an Australian rules football semi-professional league operating in Darwin in the Northern Territory.

The league is one of few (and the highest level) Australian Rules competitions played during the Australian Summer with the season beginning in October and ending in March, because cricket cannot be played during the wet season, due to high levels of rain, resulting in the football and cricket seasons being swapped. The league regularly attracts high-profile semi-professional players from interstate leagues due to its lack of salary cap and the timing of the season, which allows players to play extra matches during the rest of Australia's off-season.

History

While most other Australian rules leagues in Australia operate during the southern hemisphere winter, the NTFL chooses to play in the Northern Territory's 'wet season' from October to March, primarily due to hard playing surfaces during the 'dry season'.

The NTFL was founded in 1916 with The Wanderers Football Club and Waratah Football Club as founding members. Waratahs are the only club to have competed in every season of the NTFL. Darwin (Buffalos Football Club) was formed in 1917, Nightcliff in 1950, St Marys in 1952, Palmerston in 1972 (as North Darwin), Southern Districts in 1987 and the Tiwi Bombers in 2006 (with full entry in 2007).

The 1974-75 season was abandoned due to Cyclone Tracy.

In the 1990s, the league ran into financial problems primarily due to the Northern Territory government luring the league to the new purpose-built stadium at Marrara Oval after its construction in 1991.  The move pushed the league's operating costs up drastically despite contrary promises from the NT government. Marrara Oval is now known as TIO Stadium, as part of a naming rights deal with NT health insurance company, Territory Insurance Office.

During this history of the league it has exported successful players to other leagues, notable players have included Michael McLean, Maurice Rioli and Michael Long.

In 2006, it was announced that a team representing the Tiwi Islands, called the Super Tiwis would be added to the 2006/07 season for eight games against teams that would normally have the bye. They became a permanent part of the league in the 07/08 season as the Tiwi Bombers, clad in Essendon Football Club style guernseys of black and red.

There was also a push for an NTFL representative club to compete in the Adelaide-based South Australian National Football League (SANFL).  The first of a series of trial matches was held in 2006, with a long term view of admitting a Darwin side into the SANFL.  A strong crowd at Marrara Oval witnessed SANFL club North Adelaide defeat a composite NTFL squad by 27 points, demonstrating that a Darwin team could be competitive.  There was a push to make the event an annual match, however, the NTFL decided on fielding a side in the AFL Queensland State League from 2009 (which became the Northern Conference of the North East Australian Football League in 2011) and the Northern Territory Football Club was formed.

In 2010 it was decided to merge the NTFL with the Top End Australian Football Association (TEAFA) to create a three division competition in which the NTFL would make the Premier League whilst the NTFL reserve competition and clubs from the TEAFA would incorporate the First Division and Second Divisions.

The 2012/2013 season saw Banks Bulldogs and the Central Australian Football Club placed on a four-match trial in the Premier League, for possible full-time inclusion. The Bulldogs, originally a part of the TEAFA competition, would stay in the NTFL Division One competition. But the CAFC team would continue their trial run in the Premier League, the number of games extended to 10 for the 2013/2014 season. However, the side did not become a permanent team in the competition.

League structure
The league consists of both junior and senior divisions. The A Grade competition is known as the NTFL Men's Premier League and includes eight clubs (Darwin, Nightcliff, Palmerston, Southern Districts, St Mary's, Tiwi Bombers, Wanderers, and Waratah). The reserves are divided into two divisions known as Division 1 (B Grade) and Division 2 (C Grade). Division one includes all Premier League clubs, excluding the Tiwi Bombers, and four other clubs which were formerly in the TEAFA competition (Banks, PINT, Tracy Village, and University). Division 2 consists of nine clubs with the inclusion of Jabiru. The A Grade Women's competition consists of eight clubs, including all Premier League clubs, except for the Tiwi Bombers replaced by Tracy Village.

The junior division is broken into age groups, under 18's, under 16's, youth girls, under 14's, and under 12's, with all age groups split into two divisions, except for under 18's and youth girls. Under 18's is the only junior division with a fixed number of clubs, including all Premier League clubs, except for the Tiwi Bombers replaced by Big River Hawks. The rest of the junior divisions vary based on participation levels each year, however, the clubs with juniors are all the Premier League clubs and Tracy Village.

Clubs

Current clubs
Premier League Clubs

Division One/Two Clubs

Former Clubs

Former Premier League Clubs

Coverage

Media

Television
In 2006, NTFL premier league matches were broadcast nationally for the first time ever on ABC2 each Sunday afternoon from February to March. Previously the matches had only been shown in the Territory on ABC Darwin. In 2008, it reverted to local broadcasting. During the 2014/15 season, the Saturday 3.00pm premier league match was broadcast live on ABC in Darwin. During the 2017/18 season, Southern Cross TV broadcast one game a week on Sunday afternoons. Since then  National Indigenous Television (NITV) broadcasts nationally replays of one game a week throughout the week starting Sunday afternoons.

Radio
During the 2014/15 season, one premier league match was broadcast on ABC Local Radio, the match was either the late or early Saturday game and was an alternate match to the TV-broadcast game. In 2017/18, ABC will continue to broadcast one game a week on the digital radio frequency 105.7FM with a commentary team including Dominic McCormack, Natasha Medbury and Kieran Davis.

Internet
Internet broadcasting commenced through YouTube during the 2012/2013 season, followed by its inclusion on the ABC iView on-demand service the 2013/2014 season which uses the recordings taken from the match day broadcast. The TV broadcast match was simulcast live on ABC Grandstand on YouTube during the 2014/15 season.

Attendance
The NTFL attracts strong local crowds. The 2005 Grand final attracted a crowd of over 5,000 people. One of the biggest crowds was the 2010/11 Grand Final between St Mary's and Wanderers, with the Wanderers prevailing with a 28-point win, which attracted an over 9,000 crowd.

Premier tally

Wooden Spoon tally

Competition timeline

Women's Premier League
The Woman's NTFL competition was all started in 2004 and currently has 10 teams enrolling.

Teams 
Premier League Clubs

Grand Finals

See also
AFL Northern Territory
Australian rules football in the Northern Territory

References

External links
 Official website
 Official Twitter
 NTFL pages on Full Points Footy

 
Sport in Darwin, Northern Territory
Australian rules football competitions in the Northern Territory
Professional sports leagues in Australia